is a versus fighting game in the Touhou Project game series. The game, by Twilight Frontier and Team Shanghai Alice, can be played as a standalone game or as an expansion pack for the previous fighting game Scarlet Weather Rhapsody. In the Touhou Project overall, it is labeled as the 12.3rd Touhou game.

Gameplay

Touhou Hisoutensoku stayed true to its predecessors in that it retained most of the Immaterial'''s basic system and moves. Projectiles are still the main attack feature, grazing is still an effective way of evasion and the changing weather affects every match. In addition, Touhou Hisoutensoku added some new spellcards and weather system for the characters to turn the tide of battle. Touhou Hisoutensoku also provides built-in support for multiplayer games over the internet like its predecessor.

Characters from Scarlet Weather Rhapsody can be made playable in Touhou Hisoutensoku if the player also owns that game on the same computer. The imported characters have new moves and new winning dialog in the arcade and versus modes, though they do not have a storyline associated with Touhou Hisoutensoku.

Card deck system
Mostly identical to Scarlet Weather Rhapsody, Touhou Hisoutensoku allows the player to assemble a "deck" of 20 cards. Cards become available for in-play use as the player deals or receives damage. New cards for can be obtained through various actions in gameplay (such as defeating an opponent).

Cards fall into three categories: System Cards, Skill Cards, and Spell Cards. System Cards include bombs (like in Immaterial, knocks the enemy back), weather change, and other miscellaneous options. Skill Cards upgrade special attacks to do more damage, allow the player to gain alternate special attacks, or both. Spell Cards are powerful attacks that automatically work once activated. Proper assembly of card decks according to the player's style is key to mastering the game, since the decks limit what the characters can do during a match.

A departure from Scarlet Weather Rhapsody is the personalized System Cards, each associated with a character. These replace the System Cards of Scarlet Weather Rhapsody.

Weather
The weather changes during a match, which subjects the two combatants to some handicap according to the weather, as listed below. There are no weather effects in the Story Mode, unlike in Scarlet Weather Rhapsody. Five additional weathers are introduced in this game, along with modifications of some old ones.

Plot
A mysterious giant is seen wandering around Gensokyo. It can suddenly appear and can just as suddenly vanish seemingly without a trace. Everyone who sees it becomes curious and wonders about the truth behind this strange sight. Sanae Kotiya, Cirno, and Hong Meirin each have their own fears and dreams about the giant, and each sets out in pursuit of this roaming behemoth.

Exploring the Forest of Magic, the Scarlet Devil Mansion, and the subterranea, the heroines face many challenges and obstacles in their pursuit of a mystery that's far deeper than it first appears.

Characters
As a standalone game, Touhou Hisoutensoku only features 9 characters total (Including the Giant Catfish). Combined with the characters from Scarlet Weather Rhapsody, the game has a total of 20 characters.

Sanae Kotiya (東風谷早苗) - The miko of the Moriya Shrine. She is one of the persons who noticed the Hisoutensoku rampaging around Gensokyo.
Cirno (チルノ) - The ice fairy of the Misty Lake. She thought the giant thing she saw was the great yokai Daidarabocchi.
Hong Meirin (紅美鈴) - The gate guardian of the Scarlet Devil Mansion. She dreams that the Giant Catfish is the giant shadow and the one wanting her powers to come back to the earth and cause destruction.
Reimu Hakurei (博麗霊夢) - The miko of the Hakurei Shrine.
Marisa Kirisame (霧雨魔理沙) - A magician living in the Forest of Magic and played a prank on Cirno.
Utsuho Reiuzi (霊烏路空) - The operator of the nuclear facility in the Hell of Blazing Flames.
Patchouli Knowledge (パチュリー・ノーレッジ) - The resident bookworm of the Scarlet Devil Mansion.
Alice Margatroid (アリス・マーガトロイド) - A puppeteer magician who also lives in the Forest of Magic. She was experimenting with Goliath-sized puppets, which caught Cirno's attention. She is the last boss in Cirno's Route.
Suwako Moriya (洩矢諏訪子) - One of the goddesses of the Moriya Shrine and the last boss in Sanae's route.

Development
Like with Immaterial and Missing Power and Scarlet Weather Rhapsody, ZUN of Team Shanghai Alice only did parts of the game while Twilight Frontier did most of the game-making. ZUN, besides overseeing the whole development, also provided the storyline, new character designs, spell card names, and three new music tracks for the game. The full version was released at Comiket 76 on August 15, 2009.

Unlike the main line of Touhou games where the character artwork is drawn by ZUN, the dialog character sprites and ending artwork in Touhou Hisoutensoku are drawn by alphes from the Twilight Frontier team, as is the case with Immaterial and Missing Power and Scarlet Weather Rhapsody''.

Soundtrack
The soundtrack of the game was compiled into an album named , first sold in Comiket 77 on December 30, 2009.

References

External links
Official website 
Touhou Hisoutensoku on Touhou Wiki
Touhou Hisoutensoku wiki

2009 video games
Fighting games
Japan-exclusive video games
Multiplayer and single-player video games
Touhou Project games
Twilight Frontier games
Video games developed in Japan
Windows games
Windows-only games